Mario Visconti (born 23 October 1968) is a former professional tennis player from Italy.

Career
In the 1993 French Open, his only Grand Slam appearance, Visconti defeated Luis Herrera to make the second round, where he was beaten by Carl-Uwe Steeb. His best ATP Tour performances also came that year. He teamed up with Massimo Ardinghi in August to make the doubles quarter-final at the Austrian Open and in the same month he also was a semi-finalist in the doubles at San Marino, partnering Paolo Canè.

Challenger titles

Singles: (2)

Doubles: (1)

References

External links
 
 

1968 births
Living people
Italian male tennis players
People from Eboli
Sportspeople from the Province of Salerno